Cotesia vestalis is a parasitoid wasp that appears to be able to detect volatile organic compounds emitted by the plant Brassica oleracea in response to herbivore damage, such as would be caused (for example) by heavy infestation with the wasp's host caterpillar Plutella xylostella.

Diseases 
C. vestalis suffers from a polydnavirus, Cotesia vestalis bracovirus.

References

External links 
 YouTube video of C. vestalis attacking host caterpillars
 Photograph of C. vestalis

Microgastrinae
Hymenoptera of Europe
Biological pest control wasps

Insects described in 1834